Sally Pressman Bernstein is an American actress and dancer. She is perhaps best known for her role as Roxy LeBlanc on the Lifetime television series Army Wives (2007–2013).

Early life
Pressman was born Sally Pressman Bernstein in New York City. She is the daughter of Penny Ann Pressman and Jonathan Bernstein. Pressman's mother studied fine arts and theater at Brandeis University and works for Christie's Auction House. Pressman's father is a lawyer and investor. She no longer uses her childhood name of Sally Bernstein professionally, preferring her mother's maiden name. Pressman has a brother, Benjamin Rhodes Bernstein. Her maternal grandparents were Rhoda and William Manny Pressman. William Pressman, as Executive Vice President of Hasbro Toys, is credited for creating the G.I. Joe action figure, an armed forces doll. Her maternal great-uncle was Jack Pressman, the founder of Pressman Toy Corporation.

As a child, she attended Spence School for girls in New York. She was classically trained in ballet and was a member of the Manhattan Ballet Company. She graduated with a Bachelor of Arts degree in theater studies from Yale University, where she also participated in such productions as The Merchant of Venice, The Dining Room, Freedomland and Sylvia. In London, she played in the West End premiere of Burleigh Grime$ in the role of Mrs. Grimes (2004).

Career

Apart from a minor role in the film Swordswallowers and Thin Men, shot at Yale while she was still a student, her film career effectively began in 2006 with the independent horror film, Last Rites of the Dead. She also appeared in another independent horror film, The Dread, released in 2007. In 2006, she appeared on the pilot episode of CBS series Shark, and later guest-starred in Criminal Minds.

Pressman is best known for her role as Roxy LeBlanc on the Lifetime Television drama series Army Wives. She was regular cast member in the first six seasons (2007 to 2012). In 2013 she appeared in two episodes of season 7. With other members of the Army Wives cast, she joined the picket line on November 13, 2007 in support of striking writers. She also played the lead role in Lifetime movie Love Sick: Secrets of a Sex Addict, and guest-starred on CBS sitcom The New Adventures of Old Christine in 2008. In 2013, she landed a lead role in an NBC comedy pilot Joe, Joe and Jane.

In 2013, Pressman was cast in recurring role as Candace Marcus, a daughter of Lisa Kudrow's character, in the third season of Shonda Rhimes drama series Scandal. In 2014 she guest-starred in the episode of CBS series Person of Interest. She also co-starred alongside Brandon Routh and Dane Cook in the sci-fi thriller film, 400 Days. In September, 2014 she was cast of the fourth season in the ABC series, Once Upon a Time, and appeared in Shonda Rhimes' Grey's Anatomy as Young Ellis Grey in flashbacks. This role previously played Sarah Paulson in Season 6. In 2016, she guest starred in two episodes of The Catch, another Rhimes' drama. Later that year, she was cast in a recurring role as Debi Mazar"s character's love interest on Younger. From 2018 to 2021, she had a recurring role in the NBC series Good Girls. Pressman also starred in an episode titled "My Monster" of Disney+ anthology series Just Beyond in 2021.

Personal life
On October 19, 2010, Pressman became engaged to her longtime boyfriend David Clayton Rogers.  The couple met at Lesly Kahn's Acting Studio.
The couple married on September 17, 2011. Pressman has a son, Josh, and a daughter, Chloe.

Filmography

Film

Television

References

External links

Living people
American female dancers
American dancers
American television actresses
American film actresses
Yale University alumni
Jewish American actresses
21st-century American actresses
Actresses from New York City
Spence School alumni
Dancers from New York (state)
21st-century American Jews
Year of birth missing (living people)